Emotion is the sixth studio album by American country music artist Martina McBride. It was released in September 1999 by RCA Nashville. The album produced four singles with "I Love You", "Love's the Only House", "There You Are" and "It's My Time" on the US Billboard Hot Country Songs chart. The song "I Love You" became McBride's biggest hit single to date after it reached number one on the country charts and peaked at number 24 on the Billboard Hot 100. The album ends with two covers, "Goodbye" by Patty Griffin and Gretchen Peters' "This Uncivil War" from Peters' 1996 debut album The Secret of Life. The album was certified Platinum on by the RIAA.

Track listing

Personnel

Musicians 
 Martina McBride – lead vocals, backing vocals (1-4, 7, 9, 11)
 John Hobbs – Wurlitzer electric piano (1, 3), Hammond B3 organ (3, 5, 7, 8), acoustic piano (5, 6, 10, 11), keyboards (9), synthesizers (10)
 Steve Nathan – Wurlitzer electric piano (2), Hammond B3 organ (4), synthesizers (5), keyboards (12)
 J. T. Corenflos – electric guitar
 Dann Huff – electric guitar (1, 3, 7, 8)
 Biff Watson – electric guitar (1, 3), acoustic guitar (2, 4, 6, 8, 9, 10, 12), bouzouki (8)
 Paul Worley – acoustic guitar (2, 4, 7, 9, 11), 12-string acoustic guitar (9, 11)
 Dan Dugmore – electric guitar solo (2, 7, 11), 12-string electric guitar (5)
 B. James Lowry – acoustic guitar (5, 7, 11)
 Doug Lancio – electric guitar (11), bouzouki (11)
 Paul Franklin – steel guitar (10)
 Joe Chemay – bass 
 Mark Hammond – drum programming (1)
 Lonnie Wilson – drums (1-9, 11, 12)
 Greg Morrow – drums (10)
 Tom Roady – percussion (3, 5, 11)
 Terry McMillan – percussion (8, 9, 12)
 Michael Poole – percussion loop (9)
 Tom Douglas – harmonica (5)
 Aubrey Haynie – fiddle (12)
 John Mock – penny whistle (12)
 John Catchings – cello (6, 11)
 Anthony LaMarchina – cello (9)
 Kristin Wilkinson – viola (6, 11)
 David Davidson – violin (6, 11)
 Karen Winkelmann – violin (6, 9, 11)
 Pamela Sixfin – violin (11)
 Carolyn Dawn Johnson – backing vocals (3, 9)
 The "Cheaptones" (Tom Douglas, Erik Hellerman, Martina McBride and Paul Worley) – backing vocals (5)
 Wes Hightower – backing vocals (8)
 Troy Johnson – backing vocals (8)
 Gordon Kennedy – backing vocals (9)
 Wayne Kirkpatrick – backing vocals (9)

Production 
 Martina McBride – producer
 Paul Worley – producer
 Clarke Schleicher – recording (1-9, 11, 12), mixing 
 Mike Poole – recording (10), additional recording
 Jim Burnett – additional engineer
 Erik Hellerman – additional recording, recording assistant, mix assistant 
 Sandy Jenkins – recording assistant 
 Chris Scherbak – recording assistant
 Jed Hackett – mix assistant (1, 2, 4-12)
 Greg Fogie – mix assistant (3)
 Don Cobb – digital editing 
 Carlos Grier – digital editing 
 Denny Purcell – mastering
 Jonathan Russell – mastering assistant 
 Paige Connors – production coordinator 
 Mary Hamilton – art direction
 Gina Binkley and Alter Ego Design – design 
 Matthew Rolston – photography
 Gemina Aboitiz – wardrobe stylist 
 Robert Vetica – hair stylist
 Collier Strong – make-up

Studios
 Recorded at The Money Pit and Seventeen Grand Recording (Nashville, Tennessee)
 Mixed at The Money Pit and Ocean Way (Nashville, Tennessee)
 Digitally edited and mastered at Georgetown Masters (Nashville, Tennessee)

Chart performance

Weekly charts

Year-end charts

Certifications

References

1999 albums
Martina McBride albums
RCA Records albums
Albums produced by Paul Worley